Josip Franjo Domin (German: Joseph Franz Domin, Hungarian: József Ferenc Domin, 28 January 1754 – 19 January 1819) was a Croatian-Hungarian physicist, priest, physician and a
pioneer of electrotherapy.

Biography

Domin was born in Zagreb where he died. He was educated in Zagreb, Vienna, Leoben, Graz. In 1774 he
graduated philosophy at the Royal Academy of Sciences and theology in 1776 in Zagreb. In 1777 in Trnava he received
a doctorate in mathematics and became a full professor of theoretical and experimental physics, mechanics and economics at the Royal Academy of Sciences
in Győr (1777-1785) and Pécs (1785-1792). At the Faculty of Arts in Budapest since 1792 he was a physics professor having succeeded Ionnes B. Horváth to the chair. He was dean of the faculty
(1794-1796) and Rector of the university in Budapest (1798). Since 1800 he was a canon of Zagreb and since 1801 rector of Episcopal Seminary in Zagreb. Since 1799 he was a member of the
Arcadian Academy in Naples and Honorary Doctor of the college and since 1802 a member of the Etruscan Academy in Cortona.

Research and work

Domin dealt with the chemistry of gases and published a textbook, the first of its kind in Hungary of that time.
He performed experiments with balloons, investigated the nature and propagation of sound and refuted an established opinion of that time about the use of sound for elimination of electricity (lightning).
He investigated static electricity and its use in medicine, cured various diseases using electricity and has written four discussions on electrotherapy.
Domin also perfected the electric igniter on hydrogen and described the principle of its operation and application.

References

Sources
 
 

1754 births
1819 deaths
Physicians from Zagreb
Croatian physicists